Vate or Väte may refer to:

 Väte, a settlement on Gotland, Sweden
 A different spelling of Vata, a particular Zoroastrian divinity, one half of the pair  Vayu-Vata
Vate, a Mexican electronic music producer.

See also 
 Vates, a term for a prophet, following the Latin term